Loch Ard (Scottish Gaelic: Loch na h-Àirde) is a loch, located in Loch Lomond and the Trossachs National Park, Stirling council area, Scotland.

Overview
The name of the loch comes from àird, the Scottish Gaelic word for a promontory, headland, height, ultimately from àrd meaning high. It is sometimes considered to be the source of the River Forth, although the river's true source is the confluence of its outflow, the Avondhu River, and Duchray Water. Loch Ard lies downstream of Loch Chon. The loch contains several small islands including Eilean Gorm, Briedach, St. Mallo, which is rumoured to have an old chapel dedicated to that saint, and Dundochill, which is the site of Duke Murdoch's castle that may have been built by the Duke of Albany. Though one of Scotland's smaller lochs, it is one of the most picturesque and its sheltered location means it is ideal for kayaking and other water sports.

Location
The Queen Elizabeth Forest Park encompasses Loch Ard and the surrounding forest. The waters of Loch Ard are home to both a sailing and rowing club. The villages of Kinlochard, and Milton lie on its shores. The village of Aberfoyle lies 2 miles (3 km) to its east, with the summit of Craigmore behind it, while the mountain of Ben Lomond sits to its west.

Activities

Loch Ard is surrounded by 16 miles (26 km) of family-friendly mountain bike, walking, and horseback trails. These trails, some with waymarkers, link into a much larger network of forest fire roads, which can take the rider on >30 km circular routes through the park. The Loch Ard Family Sculpture Trails provide an interactive outdoor experience, with sculptures placed along the trails, interesting seating, and sound posts, among other features.

Loch Ard is also home to many different species of wildlife, such as roe deer, barn owls, capercaillie, and various types of plants and insects. The loch also has a large stock of brown trout, pike, and perch.

, a three-masted, square-rigged clipper ship bore its name.  The ship sank off the coast of Australia at what has been known since as Loch Ard Gorge.

References

Ard
Ard
LArd
Trossachs